BSV Bad Bleiberg was an Austrian association football club based in Bad Bleiberg, Carinthia. It was founded in 1952 and became BSV Villach Juniors and moved to Villach in 2003 as a joint-venture with FC Kärnten. The club dissolved in 2004. BSV Bad Bleiberg played in the Austrian Football First League from 2001 until 2003.

In 2006 a new club was founded under the BSV Bad Bleiberg name and plays in the lower amateur ranks.

External links
 Official club website (German)
 weltfussballarchiv.com
 foot.dk

Association football clubs established in 1952
Association football clubs disestablished in 2004
Football clubs in Austria
Association football clubs established in 2006
1952 establishments in Austria